Carlos Pinto Coelho (18 April 194415 December 2010) was a Portuguese journalist, writer, photographer and media personality.

Life and career
Carlos Pinto Coelho was born in Lisbon and lived until he was 19 in Portuguese Mozambique, African Portuguese colony. In 1963 he returned to Portugal to study law at Faculty of Law of the University of Lisbon.

He made his debut in journalism in January 1968 as a reporter in the Lisbon daily newspaper Diário de Notícias. He was drafted as a second lieutenant of the Portuguese Army and served in the Portuguese Colonial War in the war in Mozambique (1970/1973). After the Carnation Revolution in 1975 he was one of the founders of the daily newspaper Jornal Novo as head of international news desk. Until 1977 he also worked on the editorial staff of the ANI news agency, on the editorial staff of the weekly news magazine Vida Mundial and was one of the Portuguese correspondents for Radio Deutsche Welle. In 1982 he became executive director of Mais news magazine.

At RTP – Radiotelevisão Portuguesa Portuguese public television he was deputy head of News (1977), chief editor of the daily news program Informação/2 (1978), director of Programs (1986/1989) and director of International Relations and African Cooperation (1989/1991). He was the author and host of the award-winning daily cultural newscast "Acontece" (1994–2003).

Radio
Editor and host of programs at radios TSF, Rádio Comercial, RDP/ Antena 1, TDM/Rádio Macau, and from October 1998 until his death, the weekly Program "Agora Acontece" broadcast across 92 local radio stations in continental Portugal, Azores, Madeira, Macau and Spanish Extremadura.

Teaching
Lecturer at the Institut for High Military Studies( 1988–1992). Professor of journalism at ETIC (Lisbon) and at the Politecnical Institut of Tomar (2003–2006).

He was a member of the Opinion Council at RDP- Portuguese public radio, of the Board of the Portuguese Society of Authors and of the National Board of Portuguese Historical Discoveries.

Other assignments
1986–1987 – Member of the Board of the European consortium of television stations Europa TV – Hilversum, Holland.
1989–1992: Coordinator for the Meeting of Portuguese-speaking Television Stations: Lisbon – São Paulo/ Rio de Janeiro – Sal (Cape Verde). *1990: President elect of the East-West Committee of the International University of Radio and Television (URTI- Paris).
1991: President elect of the North-South Committee URTI.
1977–1992: Representative for RTP on the Committees of Information and Programs of EBU (European Broadcasting Union), URTNA (Union of African National Radios and Televisions), OTI (Organization of Iberian-American Television Stations) and the Prize for Script-writing Prix Genève-Europe.
He was the Representative of Portugal's Ministry of Culture at the Meeting of the Iberian Television Stations (Mexico, 2005).
He was Member of the Jury of the International Film Festivals of Troia (1986), Fantasporto (1987), Cinanima (1996) and at the Portuguese Film Board ICCAM-2006.

He became a Comendador of the Order of Infante Dom Henrique in 2000, Officier of the French "Ordre des Arts et des Lettres", and received the "Bordalo" award for Television (Casa de Imprensa – 1995) and the Grand Prize "Gazeta" (Portuguese Press Club – 1997) and the Career Award/Manuel Pinto de Azevedo Jr. (Oporto's newspaper O Primeiro de Janeiro- 2002). He has the Gold Medal of the City of Amadora.

Published books 
A Meu Ver (Pégaso, 1992)
Do Tamanho do Mundo (co-autoria – Ataegina, 1998)
De Tanto Olhar (Campo das Letras, 2002)
A Meu Ver (2ª edição corrigida e aumentada – ASA, 2006)
Assim Acontece – 30 Entrevistas Sobre Tudo... E o Resto (Texto Editores, 2007).
Vozes anoitecidas – Audiobook

Photography
Since 1981 his photographic works went public on 49 solo exhibitions and 7 collective exhibitions, in Portugal, Madeira, Spain, Finland and Mozambique.

References

External links

1944 births
2010 deaths
Portuguese journalists
Male journalists
Portuguese male writers
People from Lisbon